Part of the troff suite of Unix document layout tools, eqn is a preprocessor that formats equations for printing.  A similar program, neqn, accepted the same input as eqn, but produced output tuned to look better in nroff. The eqn program was created in 1974 by Brian Kernighan and Lorinda Cherry.
It was implemented using yacc compiler-compiler.

The input language used by eqn allows the user to write mathematical expressions in much the same way as they would be spoken aloud.  The language is defined by a context-free grammar, together with operator precedence and operator associativity rules.  The eqn language is similar to the mathematical component of TeX, which appeared several years later, but is simpler and less complete.

An independent compatible implementation of the eqn preprocessor has been developed by GNU as part of groff, the GNU version of troff.  The GNU implementation extends the original language by adding a number of new keywords such as smallover and accent. mandoc, a specialised compiler for UNIX man pages, also contains a standalone eqn parser/formatter.

History 
Eqn was done by using yacc parser generator.

Syntax examples 
Here is how some examples would be written in eqn (with equivalents in TeX for comparison):

Spaces are important in eqn; tokens are delimited only by whitespace characters, tildes ~, braces {} and double-quotes "".

References

Bibliography

External links 
Typesetting Mathematics, User's Guide (Second Edition)

 

eqn
Plan 9 commands